Frank McKenzie (10 December 1896–unknown) was a Scottish footballer who played in the Football League for Newport County and Rotherham County.

References

1896 births
Year of death missing
Scottish footballers
Association football defenders
English Football League players
Inverness Thistle F.C. players
Rotherham County F.C. players
Newport County A.F.C. players
Scunthorpe United F.C. players
Gainsborough Trinity F.C. players
Newark Town F.C. players